Salomon (de) Koninck (1609 – buried 8 August 1656) was a Dutch painter of genre scenes and portraits, and an engraver.

Koninck was born in Amsterdam, the son of a goldsmith, originally from Antwerp, and was a nephew of Philips de Koninck.  Salomon became a pupil of Pieter Lastman, David Colijns, François Venants and Claes Corneliszoon Moeyaert.  From 1630 he was a member of the Sint Lucasgilde.  He moved in the circles of Rembrandt and the academy of Hendrick van Uylenburgh, making many copies of Rembrandt's compositions.  His paintings have a warm colour palette and include many "philosophers" or scholars. Perhaps one of the better known of these is the Philosopher with an Open Book at the Louvre that was long attributed to Rembrandt and served as companion piece to Rembrandt's Philosopher in Meditation.

He married a daughter of Adriaen van Nieulandt and later a sister of Antonie van Stralen.  He died in Amsterdam in 1656.

External links
This article is a translation from the Dutch Wikipedia.
Information at the Netherlands Institute for Art History
Salomon Koninck at PubHist
St. Matthew with an Angel by Salomon Koninck from the Museum & Gallery collection in Greenville, SC

Dutch Golden Age painters
Dutch male painters
Dutch genre painters
1609 births
1656 deaths
Dutch Golden Age printmakers
Painters from Amsterdam